David Benefield (born May 17, 1986) is an American professional poker player considered a high-stakes online cash game specialist who has earnings of over $900,000 from online winnings playing under his name on Full Tilt Poker. He made the World Series of Poker Main Event final table in 2013 finishing 8th.

Poker career

Benefield picked up the name “Raptor” when he first ran $450 into $20,000. By the age of 20, he shared a half-million-dollar house in Fort Worth with fellow online high-stakes cash game specialist Tom Dwan.

As of 2014, Benefield's total live tournament winnings exceed $2,200,000 of which $1,430,630 of his total winnings have come from cashes at the WSOP.

References

External links
 David Benefield Hendon Mob profile

American poker players
Living people
1986 births